Corlies–Hart–Ritter House is a historic home located at Poughkeepsie, Dutchess County, New York.  It was built about 1872, and is a -story, Second Empire style frame dwelling with a -story rear section. A garage was added about 1920. It has a fishscale slate-covered, concave-shaped mansard roof. The front façade features a full-width, one-story, flat-roofed, porch.  It was home to three successive families important in local musical history.

It was added to the National Register of Historic Places in 2013.

References 

Houses on the National Register of Historic Places in New York (state)
Second Empire architecture in New York (state)
Houses completed in 1872
Houses in Poughkeepsie, New York
National Register of Historic Places in Poughkeepsie, New York